XHEZ-FM (branded as La Gran Zeta) is a Regional Mexican radio station in Caborca, Sonora.

History
XEEZ-AM 970 received its concession on December 20, 1957. It was owned by José de Jesús Palacios Lares, and upon his death, ownership transferred to his widow, Josefina Enciso Vda. de Palacios. Ownership was placed in a company controlled by members of the Palacios family in 2006.

On October 19, 2011, XEEZ was authorized to move to FM as XHEZ-FM 90.7, sharing a tower with co-owned XHCBR-FM 100.1.

References

Regional Mexican radio stations
Radio stations in Sonora